Rafael Robert Christopher "Ralf" Elshof (born 5 July 1962) is a Dutch cyclist. He competed in the men's team pursuit event at the 1984 Summer Olympics, finishing in tenth place.

See also
 List of Dutch Olympic cyclists

References

1962 births
Living people
Dutch male cyclists
Olympic cyclists of the Netherlands
Cyclists at the 1984 Summer Olympics
People from Wijchen
Cyclists from Gelderland